Scotinella is a genus of North American araneomorph spiders in the family Phrurolithidae, first described by Nathan Banks in 1911.

Species
 it contains twenty-four species:
Scotinella adjacens (Gertsch & Davis, 1940) – Mexico
Scotinella approximata (Gertsch & Davis, 1940) – Mexico
Scotinella britcheri (Petrunkevitch, 1910) – USA, Canada
Scotinella brittoni (Gertsch, 1941) – USA, Canada
Scotinella coahuilana (Gertsch & Davis, 1940) – Mexico
Scotinella custeri Levi, 1951 – USA
Scotinella debilis (Gertsch & Davis, 1940) – Mexico
Scotinella deleta (Gertsch, 1941) – USA
Scotinella diversa (Gertsch & Davis, 1940) – Mexico
Scotinella divesta (Gertsch, 1941) – USA, Canada
Scotinella divinula (Gertsch, 1941) – USA, Canada
Scotinella dixiana Roddy, 1957 – USA
Scotinella elpotosi Chamé-Vázquez & Jiménez, 2022 – Mexico
Scotinella fratrella (Gertsch, 1935) – USA, Canada
Scotinella madisonia Levi, 1951 – USA, Canada
Scotinella manitou Levi, 1951 – USA
Scotinella minnetonka (Chamberlin & Gertsch, 1930) – USA, Canada
Scotinella pallida Banks, 1911 (type) – USA
Scotinella pelvicolens (Chamberlin & Gertsch, 1930) – USA
Scotinella pugnata (Emerton, 1890) – USA, Canada
Scotinella redempta (Gertsch, 1941) – USA, Canada
Scotinella sculleni (Gertsch, 1941) – USA, Canada
Scotinella tamaulipana (Gertsch & Davis, 1940) – Mexico
Scotinella tepejicana (Gertsch & Davis, 1940) – Mexico

References

Araneomorphae genera
Phrurolithidae
Taxa named by Nathan Banks
Articles created by Qbugbot